The Whole Earth Catalog (WEC) was an American counterculture magazine and product catalog published by Stewart Brand several times a year between 1968 and 1972, and occasionally thereafter, until 1998. The magazine featured essays and articles, but was primarily focused on product reviews. The editorial focus was on self-sufficiency, ecology, alternative education, "do it yourself" (DIY), and holism, and featured the slogan "access to tools". While WEC listed and reviewed a wide range of products (clothing, books, tools, machines, seeds, etc.), it did not sell any of the products directly. Instead, the vendor's contact information was listed alongside the item and its review. This is why, while not a regularly published periodical, numerous editions and updates were required to keep price and availability information up to date.

Steve Jobs compared The Whole Earth Catalog to Internet search engine Google in his June 2005 Stanford University commencement speech. 
When I was young, there was an amazing publication called The Whole Earth Catalog, which was one of the bibles of my generation ... It was sort of like Google in paperback form, 35 years before Google came along. It was idealistic and overflowing with neat tools and great notions. 
Then at the very end of this commencement speech Jobs quotes explicitly the farewell message placed on the back cover of the last 1974 edition of the Catalog (#1180 October 1974 titled Whole Earth Epilog) and makes it his own final recommendation : "Stay hungry. Stay foolish."

Origins

The title Whole Earth Catalog came from a previous project by Stewart Brand. In 1966, he initiated a public campaign to have NASA release the then-rumored satellite photo of the sphere of Earth as seen from space, one of the first images of the "Whole Earth". He thought the image might be a powerful symbol, evoking a sense of shared destiny and adaptive strategies from people. The Stanford-educated Brand, a biologist with strong artistic and social interests, believed that there was a groundswell of commitment to thoroughly renovating American industrial society along ecologically and socially just lines, whatever they might prove to be.

Andrew Kirk in Counterculture Green notes that the Whole Earth Catalog was preceded by the "Whole Earth Truck Store" which was a 1963 Dodge truck. In 1968, Brand, who was then 29, and his wife Lois embarked "on a commune road trip" with the truck, hoping to tour the country doing educational fairs. The truck was not only a store, but also an alternative lending library and a mobile microeducation service.

Kevin Kelly, who would edit later editions of the catalog, summarizes the very early history this way:

The "Truck Store" finally settled into its permanent location in Menlo Park, California. Instead of bringing the store to the people, Brand decided to create "accumulatively larger versions of his tool catalog" and sell it by mail so the people could contact the vendors directly.

Using the most basic typesetting and page-layout tools, Brand and his colleagues created the first issue of The Whole Earth Catalog in 1968. In subsequent issues, its production values gradually improved. Its outsize pages measured 11×14 inches (28×36 cm). Later editions were more than an inch thick. The early editions were published by the Portola Institute, headed by Richard Raymond. The so-called Last Whole Earth Catalog (June 1971) won the first U.S. National Book Award in category Contemporary Affairs.
It was the first time a catalog had ever won such an award. 
Brand's intent with the catalog was to provide education and "access to tools" so a reader could "find his own inspiration, shape his own environment, and share his adventure with whoever is interested."

J. Baldwin was a young designer and instructor of design at colleges around the San Francisco Bay (San Francisco State University [then San Francisco State College], the San Francisco Art Institute, and the California College of the Arts [then California College of Arts and Crafts]). As he recalled in the film Ecological Design (1994), "Stewart Brand came to me because he heard that I read catalogs. He said, 'I want to make this thing called a "whole Earth" catalog so that anyone on Earth can pick up a telephone and find out the complete information on anything. ... That's my goal.'" Baldwin served as the chief editor of subjects in the areas of technology and design, both in the catalog itself and in other publications which arose from it.

True to his 1966 vision, Brand's publishing efforts were suffused with an awareness of the importance of ecology, both as a field of study and as an influence upon the future of humankind and emerging human awareness.

Contents
From the opening page of the 1969 Catalog:

The 1968 catalog divided itself into seven broad sections:

 Understanding Whole Systems
 Shelter and Land Use
 Industry and Craft
 Communications
 Community
 Nomadics
 Learning

Within each section, the best tools and books the editors could find were collected and listed, along with images, reviews and uses, prices, and suppliers. The reader was also able to order some items directly through the catalog.

Later editions changed a few of the headings, but generally kept the same overall framework.

The Catalog used a broad definition of "tools". There were informative tools, such as books, maps, professional journals, courses, and classes. There were well-designed special-purpose utensils, including garden tools, carpenters' and masons' tools, welding equipment, chainsaws, fiberglass materials, tents, hiking shoes, and potters' wheels. There were even early synthesizers and personal computers.

The Catalog'''s publication coincided with a great wave of convention-challenging experimentalism and a do-it-yourself attitude associated with "the counterculture," and tended to appeal not only to the intelligentsia of the movement, but to creative, hands-on, and outdoorsy people of many stripes. Some of the ideas in the Catalog were developed during Brand's visits to Drop City.

With the Catalog opened flat, the reader might find the large page on the left full of text and intriguing illustrations from a volume of Joseph Needham's Science and Civilization in China, showing and explaining an astronomical clock tower or a chain-pump windmill, while on the right-hand page are a review of a beginners' guide to modern technology (The Way Things Work) and a review of The Engineers' Illustrated Thesaurus. On another spread, the verso reviews books on accounting and moonlighting jobs, while the recto bears an article in which people tell the story of a community credit union they founded. Another pair of pages depict and discuss different kayaks, inflatable dinghies, and houseboats.

Publication after 1972
After 1972, the catalog was published sporadically. An important shift in philosophy in the Catalogs occurred in the early 1970s, when Brand decided that the early stance of emphasizing individualism should be replaced with one favoring community. He had originally written that "a realm of intimate, personal power is developing"; regarding this as important in some respects (to wit, the soon-emerging potentials of personal computing), Brand felt that the overarching project of humankind had more to do with living within natural systems, and this is something we do in common, interactively.

The broad interpretation of "tool" coincided with that given by the designer, philosopher, and engineer Buckminster Fuller, though another thinker admired by Brand and some of his cohorts was Lewis Mumford, who had written about words as tools. Early editions reflected the considerable influence of Fuller, particularly his teachings about "whole systems," "synergetics," and efficiency or reducing waste. By 1971, Brand and his co-workers were already questioning whether Fuller's sense of direction might be too anthropocentric. New information arising in fields like ecology and biospherics was persuasive.

By the mid-1970s, much of the Buddhist economics viewpoint of E. F. Schumacher, as well as the activist interests of the biological species preservationists, had tempered the overall enthusiasm for Fuller's ideas in the catalog. Still later, the amiable-architecture ideas of people like Christopher Alexander and similar community-planning ideas of people like Peter Calthorpe further tempered the engineering-efficiency tone of Fuller's ideas.

In 1974, the Whole Earth Epilog was published, which was intended as a "volume 2" to the Last Whole Earth Catalog. An updated edition of The Last Whole Earth Catalog appeared in 1975. In 1980, The Next Whole Earth Catalog was published; it was so well received that an updated second edition was published in 1981.

In the 1980s there were two editions of the Whole Earth Software Catalog, a compendium for which Doubleday had bid $1.4 million for the trade paperback rights.

In 1986, The Essential Whole Earth Catalog was published, and in 1988 the WEC was published on CD-ROM using an early form of hypertext developed by Apple Computer called HyperCard.Hypercard Mania!. Computer Chronicles, 1987. Stewart Cheifet Productions (archive.org) In 1988, there was a WEC dedicated to Communications Tools. A Whole Earth Ecolog was published in 1990, devoted exclusively to environmental topics. Around this time there were special WECs on other topics (e.g., The Fringes of Reason in 1989).

The last "full" WEC, entitled The Millennium Whole Earth Catalog, was published in 1994.

A slender, but still on A3 paper 30th Anniversary Celebration WEC was published in 1998 as part of Issue 95 of the Whole Earth magazine; it reprinted the original WEC along with new material. An important aspect of this copy of the first WEC was a limitation placed on it by book publishers who "begged [Whole Earth] not to reprint the Catalog with their names anywhere near books they no longer carry". As a result, all such information was placed at the back of the catalog. This placement hampered a valuable function of the WEC: nudging publishers to keep featured seminal works in print.

Publication history

Books
Three books were serialized in the pages of the WEC, printing a couple of paragraphs per page. This made reading the catalog a page-by-page experience.
 Divine Right's Trip by Gurney Norman, July 1971 edition
 Tales of Tongue Fu by Paul Krassner, October 1974 edition
 The Rising Sun Neighborhood by Anne Herbert, March 1981 edition

 Impact and legacy 

Kevin Kelly said this in 2008:

For this new countercultural movement, information was a precious commodity. In the '60s, there was no Internet; no 500 cable channels. ... [The WEC] was a great example of user-generated content, without advertising, before the Internet. Basically, Brand invented the blogosphere long before there was any such thing as a blog. ... No topic was too esoteric, no degree of enthusiasm too ardent, no amateur expertise too uncertified to be included. ... This I am sure about: it is no coincidence that the Whole Earth Catalogs disappeared as soon as the web and blogs arrived. Everything the Whole Earth Catalogs did, the web does better.

Looking back and discussing attitudes evident in the early editions of the catalog, Brand wrote, "At a time when the New Left was calling for grassroots political (i.e., referred) power, Whole Earth eschewed politics and pushed grass-roots direct power—tools and skills."

As an early indicator of the general Zeitgeist, the catalog's first edition preceded the original Earth Day by nearly two years. The idea of Earth Day occurred to Senator Gaylord Nelson, its instigator, "in the summer of 1969 while on a conservation speaking tour out west," where the Sierra Club was active, and where young minds had been broadened and stimulated by such influences as the catalog.

Despite this popular and critical success, particularly among a generation of young hippies and survivalists, the catalog was not intended to continue in publication for long, just long enough for the editors to complete a good overview of the available tools and resources, and for the word, and copies, to get out to everyone who needed them.

 Spin-offs and inspirations 
From 1974 to 2003, the Whole Earth principals published a magazine, known originally as CoEvolution Quarterly. When the short-lived Whole Earth Software Review (a supplement to The Whole Earth Software Catalog) failed, it was merged in 1985 with CoEvolution Quarterly to form the Whole Earth Review (edited at different points by Jay Kinney, 
Kevin Kelly, and Howard Rheingold), later called Whole Earth Magazine and finally just Whole Earth. The last issue, number 111 (edited by Alex Steffen), was meant to be published in Spring 2003, but funds ran out. The Point Foundation, which owned Whole Earth, closed its doors later that year. 

The Whole Earth website continues the WEC legacy of concepts in popular discourse, medical self-care, community building, bioregionalism, environmental restoration, nanotechnology, and cyberspace. As of January 2022, the website appears to be offline. 

Recognizing the "developed country" focus of the original WEC, groups in several developing countries have created "catalogs" of their own to be more relevant to their countries. One such effort was an adaptation of the WEC (called the "Liklik Buk") written and published in the late 1970s in Papua New Guinea; by 1982 this had been enlarged, updated, and translated (as "Save Na Mekem") into the Pidgin language used throughout Melanesia, and updates of the English "Liklik Buk" were published in 1986 and 2003.

In the United States, the book Domebook One was a direct spin-off of the WEC. Lloyd Kahn, Shelter editor of the WEC, borrowed WEC production equipment for a week in 1970 and produced the first book on building geodesic domes. A year later, in 1971, Kahn again borrowed WEC equipment (an IBM Selectric Composer typesetting machine and a Polaroid MP-5 camera on an easel), and spent a month in the Santa Barbara Mountains producing Domebook 2, which went on to sell 165,000 copies. With production of DB 2, Kahn and his company Shelter Publications followed Stewart Brand's move to nationwide distribution by Random House.

In 1973, Kirsten Grimstad and Susan Rennie are part of a research project at Berkeley University and publish a feminist catalog inspired by the Whole Earth Catalog, the New Woman's Survival Catalog, which gathers feminist initiatives in different domains (art, communication, work, money, self-help, self-defense...) in the USA.

In 1969, a store which was inspired by (but not financially connected with) The Whole Earth Catalog, called the Whole Earth Access opened in Berkeley, California. It closed in 1998. In 1970 a store called the "Whole Earth Provision Co.", inspired by the catalogue, opened in Austin, Texas. It has six stores in Austin, Houston, Dallas, and San Antonio.

In late 2006, Worldchanging released their 600-page compendium of solutions, Worldchanging: A User's Guide for the 21st Century, which Bill McKibben, in an article in the New York Review of Books called "The Whole Earth Catalog retooled for the iPod generation." The editor of Worldchanging has since acknowledged the Catalog as a prime inspiration.Whole Arctic Catalog was written by Pamela Richot and Published in Backet 3: At Extremes in 2015 to draw attention to threats to the arctic region specifically, similarly to how The Whole Earth Catalog drew attention to global environmental threats.

Baker Creek Heirloom Seeds publishes a Whole Seed Catalog, with a title and cover image inspired by the Whole Earth Catalog.

Kevin Kelly, mentioned above for his role in editing later editions of the Whole Earth Catalog, maintains a web site—Cool-Tools.org—that publishes reviews of "the best/cheapest tools available. Tools are defined broadly as anything that can be useful. This includes hand tools, machines, books, software, gadgets, websites, maps, and even ideas." He also published a large format book in 2013—Cool Tools A Catalog of Possibilities—which draws on the many reviews published over the years on that web site. The format, size, and style of the book reflect and pay homage to the original Whole Earth Catalog.

 In popular culture 
In 1970, on April Fool's Day, the Whole Earth Restaurant opened at UC Santa Cruz. It was an early source of "whole foods" in Northern California until it closed in 2002.

In 1972 Warner Bros. Records release a 2 disc sample album The Whole Burbank Catalog. The cover parodied the publication's artwork.

A 2010 issue of the political art magazine made by the Adbusters Media Foundation was titled The Whole Brain Catalog, which features a parody cover with a small human brain in place of the earth, and many references to the 1960s counter culture movement. The tagline read Access to Therapies rather than Access to Tools.

On April 17, 2018, My Morning Jacket frontman Jim James announced the release of his third solo album Uniform Distortion, which he stated was inspired by The Whole Earth Catalog.Scholarship
Stewart Brand and The Whole Earth Catalog are both subjects of interest to scholars. Notable examples include works by Theodore Roszak, Howard Rheingold, Fred Turner, John Markoff, Andrew Kirk, Sam Binkley and Felicity Scott. The Stanford University Library System has a Whole Earth'' archive in its Department of Special Collections.

See also
 List of underground newspapers of the 1960s counterculture

References

Further reading
 "Access to Tools: Publications from the Whole Earth Catalog, 1968-1974." (2011) The Museum of Modern Art Library. MoMA.org. Archived from the original.
 .
 .
 .
 .
 .
 .
 .
 .

External links
 . Official website, includes scans of many magazine issues (defunct since end of 2020).
 . A symposium featuring Stewart Brand, Kevin Kelly, Howard Rheingold and Fred Turner, Cubberly Auditorium, Stanford University
 .
 .
 .
 

Appropriate technology
Environmental non-fiction books
Hippie movement
Whole Earth Catalog
Mail-order retailers
National Book Award-winning works
1960s books
1970s books
1980s books
Magazines established in 1968
Magazines disestablished in 1998
Defunct magazines published in the United States